Robert Gaineyev (born ) is a Kazakhstani male  track cyclist. He won the silver medal in the  scratch race and the bronze medal in the madison at the 2016 Asian Cycling Championships.

References

External links
 Profile at cyclingarchives.com

1994 births
Living people
Kazakhstani track cyclists
Kazakhstani male cyclists
Place of birth missing (living people)
Cyclists at the 2014 Asian Games
Cyclists at the 2018 Asian Games
Asian Games competitors for Kazakhstan
20th-century Kazakhstani people
21st-century Kazakhstani people